Brandon Dante Underwood (born June 24, 1986) is a former American football safety. He was drafted by the Green Bay Packers in the sixth round of the 2009 NFL Draft and would later be a part of their Super Bowl XLV championship team over the Pittsburgh Steelers. He played college football at Cincinnati.

College career
After going to Hamilton High School, Underwood spent his first two years at Ohio State, where he was redshirted as a freshman in 2005. He played in the season opener against Miami, recording three tackles before suffering a season-ending shoulder injury. After his sophomore season, Underwood transferred to Cincinnati, where he earned first-team All-Big East honors in his senior season, recording 4 interceptions including one of Heisman Trophy winner Sam Bradford.

Professional career

Green Bay Packers
Underwood was selected in the sixth round (187th overall) of the 2009 NFL Draft by the Packers.

He was released on September 3, 2011.

Oakland Raiders
On February 16, 2012, he signed with the Oakland Raiders. He was released by the Raiders on September 7, 2012 after landing on injured reserve.

Dallas Cowboys
On December 31, 2012, Underwood signed with the Dallas Cowboys. He was released by the Cowboys on August 27, 2013.

Toronto Argonauts
On January 9, 2014, Underwood signed with the Toronto Argonauts of the Canadian Football League. He was released by the Argonauts on August 31, 2014. On May 30, 2015, Underwood re-signed with the Toronto Argonauts. He was a free agent after the 2015 season.

Calgary Stampeders
Underwood was signed to the Calgary Stampeders practice roster on October 10, 2014.

References

External links
Toronto Argonauts bio 
Green Bay Packers bio
Cincinnati Bearcats bio

1986 births
Living people
American football cornerbacks
American football safeties
Canadian football defensive backs
American players of Canadian football
Ohio State Buckeyes football players
Cincinnati Bearcats football players
Green Bay Packers players
Oakland Raiders players
Dallas Cowboys players
Calgary Stampeders players
Toronto Argonauts players
Players of American football from Cincinnati
Players of Canadian football from Cincinnati